Piotr Biesiekirski (born 25 September 2001) is a Polish motorcycle racer.

Career
He is the first Polish racer to compete in the FIM CEV Moto2.

In 2016, he won the Polish Moto3 Cup.

In addition, Biesiekirski has raced in the Spanish Open 600 Championship and PreMoto3 Spain.

Career statistics

FIM Moto2 European Championship

Races by year
(key) (Races in bold indicate pole position) (Races in italics indicate fastest lap)

Grand Prix motorcycle racing

By season

By class

Races by year
(key) (Races in bold indicate pole position; races in italics indicate fastest lap)

References

External links

2001 births
Living people
Polish motorcycle racers
Moto2 World Championship riders
Sportspeople from Warsaw